Bi-2 is a Belarusian alternative rock band, formed in 1985 in Bobruisk, Belarus. It was one of the most successful with many sales and chart-hits in Russia. Bi-2 was awarded MTV Russian Music Awards for Best Rock Act in 2007.

History

Early history
The band was formed in 1985 in Minsk, Belarus, by two teenagers, Aleksandr "Shura" Uman and Yegor "Lyova" Bortnik, who were amateur actors. Initially, the band's name was "Bratya po Oruzhiyu" (Brothers in Arms), which was formed in 1988, then "Bereg Istini" (Shore of Truth), which resulted in the abbreviation BI-2. Lyova and Shura began to use this moniker as their stage names, and Shura eventually changed his passport surname to Bi-II.

In the beginning of the 90s the two moved to Israel and as Jews received citizenship, but in 1993 Shura moved to Australia while Lyova remained and served in the Israel Defense Forces. In 1994 Shura formed a romantic and professional relationship with pianist and artist Victoria Bilogan https://victoriabiloganart.com/ and in 1997 they recorded their first album "Bespolaya i Grustnaya Lyubov" ("Sexless and Sad Love"). During this time, Lyova and Shura continued to compose music together, exchanging their recordings and guitar tabs via Internet and phone. Before forming Chiron, Shura collaborated with Dee Ellus, his first English lyricist, in 1993 and 1994. Shura, together with Dino Molinaro and Michael Aliani, former members of Ikon, formed the darkwave band Chiron. In 1998 Lyova moved to Australia and joined Chiron as well, but the two left the project in less than two years to continue with their own band.

Modern history

In 1999 Bi-2 moved to Russia, where they previously tried to release their already recorded album "Bespolaya i Grustnaya Lubov" ("Sexless and Sad Love," 1998), but their plans were ruined by the Russian financial crisis of 1998, which affected the record business. In 1999, the band consisted only of two men, but the lineup soon was increased by session musicians. The band gained popularity only in 2000, recording the songs for the soundtrack to the popular Brother 2 movie by Aleksei Balabanov. Several score songs, included in the Bi-2 eponymous debut album, shook rock radio charts, including the influential Nashe Radio chart.

Bi-2 continued with "Meow Kiss Me" (2001) and "Foreign Cars" (2004), both achieving gold album status in Russia. Each of their albums included duet recordings with other rock musicians from such bands as Splean, Chaif, Nochniye Snaiperi, Zemfira, and others. Videos for Bi-2 songs often appear on MTV Russia. In 2005 the double CD "Odd Warrior" was released, which  consists completely of duets and collaborations.

Discography

Unreleased albums 
 Traitors Of Motherland (1988–1991)

Studio albums 
 Sexless and Sad Love (Бесполая и грустная любовь; 1998)
 Bi-2 (Би-2; 2000)
 Meow Kiss Me (Мяу Кисс Ми; 2001)
 Cars Of Foreign Make (Иномарки; 2004)
 Moloko (Молоко; 2006) (lit.: Milk)
 Amusement Park (Луна-парк; 2009)
 What Men Talk About (О чём говорят мужчины; the soundtrack to the film of the same name, 2010)
 Spirit (2011)
 #16plus (#16плюс; 2014)
 Event Horizon (Горизонт событий; 2017)
 Hallelujah  (Аллилуйя; 2022)

Re-released albums 
 BI-2 (+2 tracks; 2000)
 Sexless and Sad Love (+ Bonus CD; 2004)
 Milk (+2 tracks; 2007)

Singles 
 Silver (Серебро; 2000)
 Wolves (Волки; 2001)
 My Love (Моя любовь; 2001)
 Sand (Песок; 2003)
 Slow Star feat. Diana Arbenina (Медленная звезда; 2005)
 Muse (Муза; 2008)
 Bowie (Digital Single) (2009)
 Christmas (Digital Single) (2009)
 Optimist (Оптимист, 2011) (Digital Single) 
 Non-Air-Raid Alarm (Безвоздушная тревога; 2011)
 Island (Остров; 2011)
 #Hipster (#Хипстер; 2014)
 Dark Skies (Тёмные небеса; 2014)
 Taken To The Army (Забрали в армию; 2014)
 Grass Near The House (Трава у дома; 2015)
 Likes / Alice (Лайки / Алиса; 2016)
 Bird On The Windowsill (Птица на подоконнике; 2016)
 Pilot (Лётчик; 2017)
 Whiskey feat. John Grant (Виски; 2017)

EPs (Extended Plays) 
 Kite (Бумажный змей; 2010)

Compilations 
 Fellini Tour (live album recorded with Splean and Thomas; 2001)
 Bi-2. Collection (2CD; 2005)
 Bi-2 feat. Symphony Orchestra of Ministry of Internal Affairs Of Russia (Би-2 и Симфонический оркестр МВД России; 2010)

Remixes
 drum[a] (2002)

Internet-releases
 Bi-2. Live (2000)
 Unplugged@16tons (2003)
 Part Of Pipes (Партия дудок; 2004)
 Rock Festival In Mogilev 1989 (Могилёвский рок-съезд 1989; 2005)
 Seventh Day (Седьмой день; 2006) (Soundtrack)
 Rare Album (Раритетный; 2006)
 Without Words I (Без слов I; 2008)
 Without Words II (Без слов II, 2008)
 Fools of Fortune (Превратности судьбы; 2009) (Soundtrack) 
 One Song By One Tour (C гастролей по песне; 2010) (Bootleg)
 Unplugged@16tons (Re-Released) (2010)
 And Ship Is Sailing (И крабль плывёт; 2010)
 Without Words III (Без слов III, 2012)
 Spirit (Without Words... IV) (Spirit (Без слов… IV), 2013)
 Bi-2 feat. Prague Metropolitan Symphonic orchestra (Without Words V) (Би-2 и Prague Metropolitan Symphonic orchestra (Без слов V); 2013)

Chiron's releases 
 Eve (2000)
 Bleed (2004)

Other projects' releases
 Odd Warrior (Нечётный воин; 2005)
 Odd Warrior 2 (Нечётный воин-2; 2007)
 Odd Warrior 2,5 (Нечётный воин-2,5; 2011)
 Odd Warrior 3 (Нечётный воин-3; 2013)
 Odd Warrior. The Best (Нечётный воин. Лучшее; 2015)

References

External links

 Official Website (in Russian)
 History of the band on another web-site (in Russian)
 Russmus info on Bi-2, including English translations (in English)
 About the band at last.fm (in English)
 БИ-2: Аккорды песен (in Russian)

Musical groups established in 1988
Musical groups disestablished in 1991
Musical groups reestablished in 1998
Russian rock music groups
Russian alternative rock groups
Post-grunge groups
Russian indie rock groups
Belarusian rock music groups
Soviet rock music groups
World Music Awards winners
Russian National Music Award winners
Russian activists against the 2022 Russian invasion of Ukraine